is a Japanese actor, voice actor, model, and fashion designer.

Personal life

On March 6, 2020, Aoki publicly came out as a transgender man after initially identifying as non-binary, as well as pansexual.

Filmography

Television

Original net animation

Game

Theatre

References

External links
 

1990 births
Beauty and makeup YouTubers
Japanese male stage actors
Japanese male video game actors
Japanese male voice actors
Japanese LGBT actors
LGBT fashion designers
Living people
Transgender male actors
21st-century Japanese male actors
Japanese YouTubers
Pansexual men